Peter of Pavia was a Lombard who was Bishop of Pavia, during the reign of the Lombard King Liutprand

In the Middle Ages the city of Pavia was the capital of the Lombard Kingdom, and later home to one of the earliest and most illustrious universities in Europe.

According to Bede, the body of St. Augustine of Hippo was removed to Cagliari, Sardinia by the Catholic bishops whom the Arian Vandal Huneric had expelled from north Africa. Bede tells that the remains were subsequently redeemed out of the hands of the Saracens, at a cost of sixty thousand gold crowns, by Peter, bishop of Pavia and uncle of the Lombard king Liutprand. After shipment to Genoa they were then deposited in the Basilica of San Pietro in Ciel d'Oro ("St. Peter in Golden Sky"), about the year 720.

References

735 deaths
Italian Roman Catholic saints
8th-century Italian bishops
Bishops of Pavia
Year of birth unknown